Tirurangadi is a municipal town in Malappuram district of Kerala, India. It is a historic town famed for its active participation in the freedom struggle, especially those dating back to the 1920s. It serves as a local taluk and is located, 30 km south of Calicut and 140 km north of Ernakulam.

It is located 9 km east of the coastal town of Parappanangadi, 10 km northwest of Kottakkal, 11 km northeast of Tanur town, 16 km southwest of Kondotty town, 17 km north of Tirur, and 18 km west of Malappuram.

History
Tirurangadi, which was then an important centre of trade, was known by the name Tiruwarankad to the Arabs, during the middle ages. It was ruled by the Zamorin of Calicut during the Middle ages. Later in 18th century, the region came under the Kingdom of Mysore. The Battle of Tirurangadi was a series of engagements that took place between the British army and Tipu Sultan, the ruler of the Kingdom of Mysore, between 7 and 12 December 1790 at Tirurangadi, during the Third Anglo-Mysore War.

Mysore rule was followed by British Raj at the end of 18th century CE. Cheranad was a name of an erstwhile province in the kingdom of Zamorin of Calicut, which had included parts of present-day Tirurangadi and Tirur Taluks of Malappuram district in it. Later it became a Taluk of Malabar District, when Malabar came under the British Raj. The headquarters of Cheranad Taluk was the town of Tirurangadi. Later the Taluk was merged with Eranad Taluk.

Tirurangadi was one of the main centres of Malabar Rebellion of 1921. The Tirurangadi Taluk Office, which was an important administrative centre during British Raj, is also a monument of the rebellion. 

When Tirur Taluk was formed in 1957, Tirurangadi block became a part of it. Later in 1990's, Vengara and Tirurangadi Revenue blocks were separated to form the modern Tirurangadi Taluk.

Geography

Civic administration

Tirurangadi Municipality Election 2020
 Municipal Chairman :
Janab K.P.Mohammed Kutty 
[Indian Union Muslim league. ]
Vice Chair Person.
C.P. Suharabi [ Indian National Congress ]

Religion
Total population: 56,700
Hindu: 14.39%
Muslim: 85.24%
Christian: 0.23%
Sikh: 0.00%
Buddhist: 0.00%
Jain: 0.00%
Others: 0.00%
Not Stated: 0.14%

Important Masjids
Jumayath mosque Chandappadi
Jumayath mosque High school padi Tirurangadi
Jumayath mosque Thazhengadi
Melechina mosque Tirurangadi
Jumayath mosque Tirurangadi
Thazhechina Mosque Tiruranhadi
Jumayath Mosque Kakkad
Juma Masjid Karumbil
Juma Masjid Venniyur paramba
Juma Masjid Kapratupadi
Juma Masjid CK Nagar
Juma Masjid Chemmad
Juma Masjid chammad JN.
Juma Masjid Kodinhipadam
Juma Masjid Kottathangadi
Valiya Juma Masjid Pantharangadi
Valiya Mosque Kariparamba

Important Temples
Kaliyattakavu Bhagavathi Temple,
Trikulam Sivakshethram,
Subrahmanya kshethram at Kachadi,
Koduvayur Subrahmanya kshethram,
Pappanur Sivakshethram Padikkal,
Tripuranthaka Kshethram Kakad,
karachina Mahadeva Kshethram,
Kaprat Sivakshethram

Transport
This town is well connected with all parts of Kerala and National Highway 66 (India) (Old number NH17) passes through this town. There are two main bus stations situated in the town, one in Chemmad, and another one in Kakkad. The former is for buses plying the nearby areas while the latter is used for long distance buses only.

The nearest railway station is at Parappanangadi, 7 km away from the town and Calicut International Airport is just 21 km away.

The famous house of Ayurveda Kottakkal Aryavaidyasala is just 10 km away from Tirurangadi.

Education
Tirurangadi, a well-versed place in the history of Freedom Fight is now known as a small educational hub in Malappuram district. The PSMO College is in the centre of the town surrounded by several other institutions. Headquarters of University of Calicut  is just 13 km away.

Colleges and schools

Tirurangadi Government Higher Secondary School and Oriental Higher Secondary School are the two important schools serving the primary educational needs of the area and nearby areas.
 "Thirurangadi yatheem khana" is a well noted institution among its kind having numerous institutions under its hood, including PSMO College, KMMMO Arabic College, SSMO Teachers Training Institute, Oriental Higher Secondary School, MKH Memorial Hospital, MKH Nursing College.

 Pocker Sahib Memorial Orphanage College (PSMO College), Tirurangadi
 KMMO Arabic College, Tirurangadi
 Govt. Poly Technic, Chelari, Tirurangadi
 SSMO Teachers Training Institute, Tirurangadi
 Govt. Higher Secondary School, Tirurangadi
 Oriental Higher Secondary School, Tirurangadi
 Govt. High School, Trikkulam, Tirurangadi
 Khuthubuzzaman English Medium Higher Secondary School, Chemmad, Tirurangadi
 MKH School of Nursing, Tirurangadi
 Gems Public School (affiliated with CBSE, Delhi), Kooriyad, PO Tirurangadi
 Kerala Residential Higher Secondary School, Karumbil, Tirurangadi
 National English Medium Higher Secondary School, Chemmad, Tirurangadi
 Malabar Central School, Valiya Paramabu, Tirurangadi
 Noorul Huda English School, Rasheed Nagar, Tirurangadi

Healthcare
 Govt.Taluk Headquarters Hospital Thirurangadi
 MK Haji Orphanage Hospital
 Chemmad Nursing Home
 Pathoor Nursing Home
 Karuna Cancer Hospital and Research Center
 Government Veterinary Dispensary Tirurangadi

Places of interest

 Tirurangadi Grand Mosque: The Tirurangadi Grand Mosque is a famous mosque located in Tirurangadi in the Malappuram District of Kerala, south India. Historically related to the Mappila Lahala of 1921 against the British Government.

 Mambaram Masjidh: Mamburam Mosque is famous for the tomb of Sayyid Alavi Mouladaveel Sayyid Alavi Thangal, a Hadrami Islamic scholar and Indian freedom fighter who settled at Mamburam in Kerala is now considered one of greatest pilgrimage centres in southern India.

See also
 Tirurangadi (State Assembly constituency)
 Tirurangadi Muslim Orphanage

References

External links
 Official website

Cities and towns in Malappuram district
Populated coastal places in India